Levan, Albania may refer to:
Levan, Fier
Levan, Berat